"Effy" is the eighth and penultimate episode of the first series of the British teen drama Skins. It was written by Jack Thorne and directed by Adam Smith. It aired on E4 on 15 March 2007. It is told from the point of view of recurring character Effy Stonem and her brother, main character Tony Stonem.

Plot

It's Jim Stonem's birthday, but he is still as bad-tempered as ever. He tries to make a rude joke about their turkey dinner and becomes angry at Tony's snide remarks. He only quiets down when his wife, Anthea, requests that he and Tony don't argue in front of Effy. The family give up on playing a board game as the instructions were translated poorly into English from Korean. Effy takes the board game upstairs and melts some of the pieces with her lighter. She pretends to go to bed but sneaks out to go partying.

Tony fondly watches her leave and pretends to be a sleeping Effy when their parents check on up them. When they leave, he tries to call his friends but they are all ignoring him in favor of Michelle. Fed up with being alone, Tony goes out into town. Meanwhile, Effy goes to a party with her talkative friend, Julie. She flirts with a boy named Spencer and shares an E with him. The group is caught by the police and they are all arrested. When Tony goes to bail Effy out of jail, he is told that someone pretending to be her brother already bailed her out. Tony sees Effy getting into a van and chases after her, but is attacked by guys with masks.

Worried about Effy, Tony goes to Chris's and requests to speak to Sid. Sid agrees to help him and they steal Sid's dad's car to look for Effy. As they drive, Sid briefly sees Cassie around the city a few times. Meanwhile, Michelle and Jal walk around town and they bump into Josh, who attempts to reconcile with her. However, Michelle orders him to leave her alone.

Effy and her friends go to a party where she meets Josh. Josh calls Tony and reveals that he is with Effy. He offers to meet them at a point, but when Tony and Sid arrive, no one is there. At the party, Josh injects Effy with drugs and she finally speaks on screen for the first time before passing out.

As they wait at the meeting point, Tony admits to Sid that he manipulated Michelle to break up with Josh. Sid is disgusted and they two get into a brief fist fight. Sid calls him a selfish monster and leaves. Tony is picked up by a stranger on a motorbike, who offers to take him to Effy. Sid calls Cassie and they meet at a fast food restaurant and make up.

Tony is taken to Josh's club, and calls Michelle to tell her where he is. In turn, she calls Sid to inform him of Tony's location. He decides to find Tony, but Cassie is hurt that he is leaving her again. Tony goes inside the club and finds Josh and a drugged up Effy. Spencer breaks Tony's flip phone. He offers to call an ambulance if Tony has sex with Effy. Tony refuses and cries and pleads for Effy's life. Josh reveals that he simply wanted to humiliate Tony as an act of revenge for Tony sending nude photos of Abigail to Michelle from Josh's phone. Sid arrives and takes Tony and Effy to a hospital. At the hospital, it is revealed that Josh injected Effy with clean, pure pharmaceuticals.

Jim and Anthea arrive at the hospital and assume Tony supplied Effy with drugs. However, Sid defends Tony. Tony thanks him and tells Sid that he is finished with being self-centered and wishes to become a better person.

Cast 

 Kaya Scodelario as Effy Stonem
 Nicholas Hoult as Tony Stonem
 Mike Bailey as Sid Jenkins
 April Pearson as Michelle Richardson
 Hannah Murray as Cassie Ainsworth
 Joe Dempsie as Chris Miles
 Dev Patel as Anwar Kharral
 Larissa Wilson as Jal Fazer

Arc significance and continuity 

 Tony is isolated from the group since his breakup with Michelle and it becoming known that he cheated on her with several girls.
 Effy's partying and drug usage come into light causing Jim and Anthea to send her to private school.
 Effy has her first piece of dialogue of the season.
 Tony begins to seek redemption and begins to change his personality for the better.
 Michelle begins talking to Tony again.
 Sid and Tony reconcile.
 Tony confesses to sending the pictures from Josh's phone.
 It is the only episode in the first series to not feature Maxxie.

Soundtrack 

 Your Heart is So Loud by Colleen
 Keep Loving Me by The Draytones
 Knife by Grizzly Bear
 Reprise by Grizzly Bear
 Sheepdog by Mando Diao
 Lake of Roaches by Wolf Eyes
 Ancient Delay by Wolf Eyes
 Fully by Gescom
 Under Me Sensi by Barrington Levy
 Hammer Without a Master by Broadcast
 Angry by Skream
 Colourful by Skream
 Close Your Eyes by Micah P. Hinson
 Subbass by Fat Segal
 0800 Dub by Skream
 Interchangeable World by Gescom
 Burned Mind by Wolf Eyes
 For Lovers by Pete Doherty
 Black Vomit by Wolf Eyes
 Dragonfly by M. Craft

References

External links 
 Watch "Effy" on 4od
 Effy on e4.com/skins
 Skins on Internet Movie DataBase

2007 British television episodes
Skins (British TV series) episodes